Chatsworth Avenue School is a public elementary school located in Larchmont, New York.  It was founded in 1902, as a two-room schoolhouse on Chatsworth Avenue.  It has 3 floors and 4 extra classes that the kids partake in several times a week: Music, Library, Gym, and Art. With its two cafeterias and three playgrounds, children always enjoy their 1-hour lunch break. School hours are from 8:40 AM to 3:00 PM. There are approximately five classes per grade, and around 22 kids per class. The current principal is Katie Anderson, who was formerly vice principal. It is a K-5 school with students advancing to the Hommocks Middle School. It is one of four elementary schools of the Mamaroneck Union Free School District.

In the mid 1970s, it was cited as an example of a school that was endeared by the community which was considering closing schools in the face of declining enrollment.

In 1998, a 4th grade teacher from the school with 31 years of experience was interviewed by the New York Times and explained why the state mandated English Language Arts test was not suitable for the grade level.

In 1999, the school was one of the top 25 schools in New York State for Percentage of 6th graders scoring at highest level in reading test.

In 2000 the school was involved in a controversy when an 11-year-old student was suspended in a nationally reported incident over alleged sexual harassment of a girl. The child's parents claimed that it was an over reaction by the school. However, due to federal privacy regulations, the school could not respond publicly regarding details of the incident. In the face of a threatened lawsuit and media pressure, the school was forced to back down. Many other parents sided with the school, saying there had been many incidents with the child and that the cited incident was simply the straw that broke the camel's back. The overall perception was that the child's parents used lawyers and the media to manipulate the situation to their advantage.

References

Larchmont, New York
Public elementary schools in New York (state)
Schools in Westchester County, New York